Ermil A. Pangrati (July 21, 1864 in Iaşi – September 19, 1931 in Bucharest) was a Romanian politician, engineer, mathematician, historian of science and architect.

Career 
He was a professor of geometry at the University of Bucharest and director of the Ion Mincu University of Architecture and Urban Planning. A member of the National Liberal Party, he sat in the Chamber of Deputies. He was also Minister of Public Works in the Titu Maiorescu cabinet during 1912.

References 

Politicians from Iași
Romanian Ministers of Public Works
Romanian Ministers of Transport
Members of the Chamber of Deputies (Romania)
Rectors of the University of Bucharest
Academic staff of the University of Bucharest
Romanian architects
Romanian mathematicians
1864 births
1931 deaths